Rêver mieux is the third studio album by Québécois singer and musician Daniel Bélanger. It was his first album to incorporate electronic music elements into his sound, which Bélanger attributed to the influence of recent music by Beth Orton, DJ Shadow and Depeche Mode.

It was certified platinum in January 2002 for selling more than 100,000 copies.

The album's supporting tour was noted for the participation of the then-unknown Ariane Moffatt as a keyboardist and backing vocalist.

Awards
The album was nominated for several Prix Félix in 2002, winning for Best Album and Best Pop Rock Album. Bélanger also won the award for Best Concert, and was cowinner with Garou of the award for Best Male Artist. The album won the Juno Award for Francophone Album of the Year at the Juno Awards of 2003, and was shortlisted for Album of the Year.

Track listing
"Te quitter" - 3:48
"Fous n'importe où" - 3:59
"Chante encore" - 4:30
"Une femme, un train, un homme et une gare" - 4:12
"Dans un spoutnik" - 5:35
"Tu tombes" - 3:12
"Une chanson pour moi" - 2:59
"Dis tout sans rien dire" - 3:23
"Intouchable et immortel" - 7:56
"Fugue en sol inconnu" - 4:37
"Air pur" - 5:53
"Rêver mieux" - 3:19
"Comme des amants" - 3:48
"Revivre" - 3:21

Certifications

Year-end charts

References

2001 albums
Daniel Bélanger albums
Audiogram (label) albums
Juno Award for Francophone Album of the Year albums